Der Kapitän is a German action-adventure television series from ZDF.

See also
List of German television series

External links
 

Nautical television series
1997 German television series debuts
2009 German television series endings
German-language television shows
ZDF original programming